Rallo may refer to:

Rallo Tubbs, fictional character in The Cleveland Show
Greg Rallo, American professional ice hockey player
Joseph Rallo, American academic administrator
Maria das Graças Rallo, birth name of Brazilian singer Cláudya
Victor Rallo, American restaurateur and wine critic
Vito Rallo, Italian prelate of the Catholic Church